This is a list of career achievements by Peter Sagan, a Slovak professional racing cyclist for UCI ProTeam, . Originally a cyclo-cross and mountain bike racing competitor as a junior, Sagan has also competed on the road as a professional since 2009. Sagan is a noted cycling sprinter and Classics specialist, and as such is a prolific winner of individual stages in stage races as well as winning World and European titles. Sagan has eighteen Grand Tour stage victories, and is a seven-time winner of the points classification in the Tour de France, a record.

Career highlights
2010
 Sagan wins his first World Tour stage at the 2010 Paris–Nice, on the third stage. He won another stage later in the race, as well as the points classification.
2011
 Sagan wins his first Grand Tour stages, winning three during the Vuelta a España.
2012
 After a fourth successive stage win in the 2012 Tour of California, Sagan establishes a record number of stage wins at the race, with seven.
 Sagan wins the opening road stage of the 2012 Tour de France, his first Tour, aged . As a result, Sagan became the youngest rider to win a Tour stage since Lance Armstrong in the 1993 Tour de France.
 Sagan becomes the ninth rider to win the points classification in the Tour de France in his first appearance in the race.
2013
 Sagan wins a total of 22 races, the most for any professional rider in 2013.
2015
 Sagan becomes the first Slovak rider to win the World Road Race Championships, soloing to victory in Richmond, Virginia.
2016
 Sagan becomes the first Slovak rider to win a Monument classic, winning the 2016 Tour of Flanders. In the process, he assumes the number one position in the UCI World Ranking.
 Sagan surpasses Hugo Koblet and Ferdinand Kübler for most stage wins at the Tour de Suisse, with his twelfth victory coming on the second stage of the 2016 Tour de Suisse.
 Sagan becomes the second rider to win the points classification in the Tour de France five times.
 After the event is opened to elite riders for the first time, Sagan becomes the inaugural winner of the men's road race at the 2016 European Road Championships.
 Sagan tops the individual rankings for the 2016 UCI World Tour, doing so for the first time.
 Sagan retains the World Road Race Championships in Qatar, becoming the first rider to retain the world title since Paolo Bettini in 2006 and 2007.
2017
 Sagan takes 100th professional career win at Grand Prix Cycliste de Québec.
 Sagan becomes the first rider to win the elite men World Championship road race three years in a row and also the first one to win three titles on three different continents, by winning the road race in Bergen. He also becomes the fifth and the youngest rider to win three career titles.
2018
 Sagan wins his second Monument by winning the 2018 Paris–Roubaix after attacking from the peloton 54 km from the finish.
 After stage 15 in the 2018 Tour de France Sagan received his 100th green jersey.
 Sagan becomes the second rider to win points classification in the Tour de France six times.
2019
 Sagan becomes the first rider to win points classification in the Tour de France seven times.
2020
 Sagan becomes the 100th rider to win stages in all three Grand Tours.
2021
 Sagan wins the points classification in the Giro d'Italia, his first points classification in a Grand Tour other than the Tour de France.

Major results
Source:

Road

2006
 3rd Road race, National Junior Championships
2007
 1st  Road race, National Junior Championships
 1st  Mountains classification, Internationale Junioren-Rundfahrt Niedersachsen
 2nd Overall La Coupe du Président de la Ville de Grudziądz
 4th Road race, UCI World Junior Championships
 4th Overall Internationale 3-Etappen-Rundfahrt
1st Stage 1
 6th Overall Trofeo Karlsberg
1st Stage 4
 8th Road race, UEC European Junior Championships
2008
 National Junior Championships
1st  Road race
2nd Time trial
 1st  Overall Po Stajerski
1st  Points classification
1st  Mountains classification
1st Stage 1 & 2
 1st  Overall Kroz Istru/Tour d'Istrie
 1st Stage 3b Trofeo Karlsberg
 1st Stage 4 Giro della Lunigiana
 2nd Overall Course de la Paix Juniors
1st Stage 4
 2nd Paris–Roubaix Juniors
 8th Road race, UEC European Junior Championships
2009
 1st Grand Prix Kooperativa
 2nd Overall The Paths of King Nikola
 3rd Grand Prix Boka
 4th Overall Grand Prix Bradlo
 4th Tour of Vojvodina II
 7th Overall Dookoła Mazowsza
1st  Points classification
1st  Young rider classification
1st Stages 2 & 5
 9th Giro del Belvedere
 10th Road race, UEC European Under-23 Championships
2010
 Paris–Nice
1st  Points classification
1st Stages 3 & 5
 1st Stage 1 Tour de Romandie
 2nd Philadelphia International Championship
 2nd Grand Prix Cycliste de Montréal
 2nd Giro del Veneto
 4th Giro della Romagna
 7th GP Ouest–France
 8th Overall Tour of California
1st  Points classification
1st  Young rider classification
1st Stages 5 & 6
2011
 1st  Road race, National Championships
 1st  Overall Giro di Sardegna
1st  Points classification
1st Stages 1, 3 & 4
 1st  Overall Tour de Pologne
1st  Points classification
1st Stages 4 & 5
 Tour de Suisse
1st  Points classification
1st Stages 3 & 8
 Tour of California
1st  Points classification
1st Stage 5
 Vuelta a España
1st Stages 6, 12 & 21
Held  after Stage 7
 1st Gran Premio Industria e Commercio di Prato
 2nd Philadelphia International Championship
 3rd Classica Sarda
 4th Gran Premio della Costa Etruschi
2012
 1st  Road race, National Championships
 Tour de France
1st  Points classification
1st Stages 1, 3 & 6
 Combativity award Stage 14
 Tour of California
1st  Points classification
1st Stages 1, 2, 3, 4 & 8
 Tour de Suisse
1st  Points classification
1st Stages 1 (ITT), 3, 4 & 6
 Tour of Oman
1st  Points classification
1st Stage 2
 1st Stage 4 Tirreno–Adriatico
 1st Stage 1 Three Days of De Panne
 2nd Gent–Wevelgem
 2nd Dutch Food Valley Classic
 3rd Amstel Gold Race
 4th Milan–San Remo
 5th Tour of Flanders
 8th UCI World Tour
2013
 1st  Road race, National Championships
 1st Gent–Wevelgem
 1st Brabantse Pijl
 1st Gran Premio Città di Camaiore
 1st Grand Prix Cycliste de Montréal
 Tour de France
1st  Points classification
1st Stage 7
 Tour de Suisse
1st  Points classification
1st Stages 3 & 8
 USA Pro Cycling Challenge
1st  Points classification
1st Stages 1, 3, 6 & 7
 Tour of Alberta
1st  Points classification
1st Prologue, Stages 1 & 5
 Tour of California
1st  Points classification
1st Stages 3 & 8
 Tirreno–Adriatico
1st Stages 3 & 6
 Tour of Oman
1st Stages 2 & 3
 1st Stage 1 Three Days of De Panne
 2nd Strade Bianche
 2nd Milan–San Remo
 2nd E3 Harelbeke
 2nd Tour of Flanders
 4th UCI World Tour
 6th Road race, UCI World Championships
 10th Grand Prix Cycliste de Québec
2014
 1st  Road race, National Championships
 1st E3 Harelbeke
 Tour de France
1st  Points classification
Held  after Stages 1–7
 Tirreno–Adriatico
1st  Points classification
1st Stage 3
 Tour de Suisse
1st  Points classification
1st Stage 3
 Tour of California
1st  Points classification
1st Stage 7
 1st Stage 4 Tour of Oman
 1st Stage 1 Three Days of De Panne
 2nd Strade Bianche
 3rd Gent–Wevelgem
 6th Paris–Roubaix
 7th Coppa Bernocchi
 10th Milan–San Remo
2015
 1st  Road race, UCI World Championships
 National Championships
1st  Road race
1st  Time trial
 1st  Overall Tour of California
1st Stages 4 & 6 (ITT)
 Tour de France
1st  Points classification
Held  after Stages 3–9
 Combativity award Stages 15 & 16
 Tirreno–Adriatico
1st  Points classification
1st Stage 6
 Tour de Suisse
1st  Points classification
1st Stages 3 & 6
 Vuelta a España
1st Stage 3
Held  after Stages 4–6
 4th Milan–San Remo
 4th Tour of Flanders
 6th Overall Tour of Qatar
1st  Young rider classification
 10th Gent–Wevelgem
2016
 1st UCI World Tour
 1st  Road race, UCI World Championships
 1st  Road race, UEC European Championships
 1st Tour of Flanders
 1st Gent–Wevelgem
 1st Grand Prix Cycliste de Québec
 Tour de France
1st  Points classification
1st Stages 2, 11 & 16
Held  after Stages 2–4
 Combativity award Stage 10 & Overall
 Tour of California
1st  Points classification
1st Stages 1 & 4
 Tour de Suisse
1st Stages 2 & 3
 2nd Road race, National Championships
 2nd Overall Tirreno–Adriatico
1st  Points classification
 2nd Omloop Het Nieuwsblad
 2nd E3 Harelbeke
 2nd Grand Prix Cycliste de Montréal
 3rd Overall Eneco Tour
1st  Points classification
1st Stages 3 & 4
 4th Strade Bianche
 7th Kuurne–Brussels–Kuurne
2017
 1st  Road race, UCI World Championships
 1st Grand Prix Cycliste de Québec
 1st Kuurne–Brussels–Kuurne
 Tirreno–Adriatico
1st  Points classification
1st Stages 3 & 5
 Tour de Suisse
1st  Points classification
1st Stages 5 & 8
 Tour of California
1st  Points classification
1st Stage 3
 Tour de Pologne
1st  Points classification
1st Stage 1
 1st Stage 3 Tour de France
 2nd Road race, National Championships
 2nd Milan–San Remo
 2nd Omloop Het Nieuwsblad
 3rd Gent–Wevelgem
 4th UCI World Tour
 7th Overall BinckBank Tour
1st  Points classification
1st Stages 1 & 3
 9th Grand Prix Cycliste de Montréal
2018
 1st  Road race, National Championships
 1st Paris–Roubaix
 1st Gent–Wevelgem
 Tour de France
1st  Points classification
1st Stages 2, 5 & 13
Held  after Stage 2
 Tour de Suisse
1st  Points classification
1st Stage 2
 Tour Down Under
1st  Points classification
1st Stage 4
 2nd UCI World Tour
 4th Amstel Gold Race
 6th Tour of Flanders
 6th Milan–San Remo
 8th Strade Bianche
 10th EuroEyes Cyclassics
 Vuelta a España
Held  after Stage 10
2019
 Tour de France
1st  Points classification
1st Stage 5
 Tour de Suisse
1st  Points classification
1st Stage 3
 1st Stage 1 Tour of California
 1st Stage 3 Tour Down Under
 2nd Grand Prix Cycliste de Québec
 4th Road race, National Championships
 4th Milan–San Remo
 5th Road race, UCI World Championships
 5th Paris–Roubaix
 6th EuroEyes Cyclassics
2020
 Giro d'Italia
1st Stage 10
Held  after Stage 2
Held  after Stages 4–5
 4th Milan–San Remo
 4th Milano–Torino
 Tour de France
Held  after Stages 3–4 & 7–9
2021
 1st  Road race, National Championships
 1st  Overall Okolo Slovenska
1st  Points classification
 Giro d'Italia
1st  Points classification
1st Stage 10
 1st Stage 1 Tour de Romandie
 1st Stage 6 Volta a Catalunya
 4th Milan–San Remo
2022
 1st  Road race, National Championships
 1st Stage 3 Tour de Suisse
 5th Milano–Torino
 7th Road race, UCI World Championships

Criteriums

2011
 2nd Criterium de Alcobendas
2012
 1st Criterium Aalst
 1st Profronde van Lommel
 1st Internationaal Criterium Bavikhove
 2nd Profronde van Stiphout
 2nd Profronde van Surhuisterveen
 2nd Antwerpen Derny Rennen
 2nd Oslo Grand Prix
 3rd Tourcriterium Ninove
 3rd Gouden Pijl
2013
 2nd Saitama Critérium by le Tour de France
2014
 2nd Tour de France Saitama Critérium
2015
 1st Criterium Aalst
 1st Profronde van Surhuisterveen
 2nd Profronde van Lommel
2016
 1st Tour de France Saitama Critérium
2017
 3rd Down Under Classic
2018
 1st Down Under Classic
 1st Tour de France Shanghai Criterium
 1st Criterium Aalst
 1st Criterium Roeselare
 1st Criterium Herentals
2019
 2nd Down Under Classic
 3rd Profronde Etten-Leur
2021
 1st Giro d'Italia Criterium Dubai

Classic results timeline

General classification results timeline

Major championships timeline

Grand Tour record

Number of wins per year
This table includes number of wins, second-, third-, top 10-place finishes, Points classification wins and race days per year excluding UCI level 2 races.

World ranking

Cyclo-cross

2006–2007
 1st  National Junior Championships
 Junior Gazet van Antwerpen
2nd Azencross
 3rd Junior Witloofveldrit
 UCI Junior World Cup
6th Kalmthout
 7th UEC European Junior Championships
 10th UCI World Junior Championships
2007–2008
 1st  National Junior Championships
 2nd  UCI World Junior Championships
 3rd  UEC European Junior Championships
 8th Overall UCI Junior World Cup
3rd Hofstade
6th Milan
6th Liévin
 Junior Superprestige
1st Diegem
2008–2009
 6th Podbrezová

Mountain Bike

2007
 3rd  Cross-country, UEC European Junior Championships
2008
 1st  Cross-country, UCI World Junior Championships
 1st  Cross-country, UEC European Junior Championships
2009
 2nd Grand Prix Dohnany

Awards

 Slovak Sportsperson of the Year: 2013, 2015, 2017
 Vélo d'Or: 2016

References

External links
 
 
 
 Peter Sagan at WVcycling
 Peter Sagan at Cyclocross24

Sagan